Eagle Field is a soccer-specific stadium located in Rock Hill, South Carolina, United States, on the campus of Winthrop University.

The 1,500 seat stadium was built in 1997 and upgraded in 2001 and 2005. It is rated as one of the top soccer facilities in Metrolina.

In 2013, Eagle Field and the Charlotte Eagles of the USL Pro hosted the first MLS team in the upstate of South Carolina when the Chicago Fire Soccer Club came to town for the U.S. Open Cup.

External links
 Information at Winthrop University

Soccer venues in South Carolina
College soccer venues in the United States
Sports venues in Charlotte, North Carolina
Sports venues completed in 1997
1997 establishments in South Carolina